Jussarö Lighthouse (Swedish: Jussarö fyr, Finnish: Jussarön majakka or Jussaaren majakka) is a lighthouse situated on the skerry of Sundharu, approximately  south of the island of Jussarö, outside Raseborg, in the western part of the Gulf of Finland. The lighthouse is more correctly called the Sundharu Lighthouse, to distinguish it from an earlier one located on Jussarö itself, which the current structure replaced.

The first illuminated lighthouse in the area was built on Jussarö in the late 1880s, along with the accommodation and service buildings for the lighthouse keepers and pilots and their families. This lighthouse was lit in 1891. There were, however, structural and technical problems with its operation, for which reason a new lighthouse was built on the uninhabited Sundharu skerry to the south of Jussarö, and lit in 1922, when the old light was deactivated.

The new Sundharu Lighthouse was the first in Finland designed to be automatically-operated from the outset. The light source was gas (acetylene), with a tank large enough to only need refilling once a month. In 1984, the gas-lit source was replaced with one powered by a wind generator, and a solar panel was added in 1999.

References

Lighthouses in Finland
Buildings and structures in Uusimaa
Lighthouses completed in 1922
Water transport in Finland
Raseborg